Raymond "Żażu" Farrugia (born 1 October 1955 in Floriana, Malta) is a football coach and former player He has been the head coach for the Malta national football team from 2 May 2018. to the end of 2019.

Club career 

Ray Farrugia started out in his hometown team of Floriana, where he played for four years between 1974 and 1978. In 1978, he left for Sydney, Australia, to play for Melita Eagles. He was popular enough to be honoured with the first ever testimonial match in Australia.

In 1990, he returned to Malta to play for Naxxar Lions, until 1994.

International career 

Farrugia played four times for Malta, twice against Tunisia, the infamous 12–1 defeat against Spain, and once against the Netherlands. He had attracted the interest of Australia when playing in Sydney, however he was unable to join the squad since he had already turned out for Malta.

Managerial career 

Between 1994 and 1998, Farrugia coached Naxxar Lions. He served as the head coach of the Malta under-21 team between 2011 and 2014. In 2014, he was promoted to assistant coach to Pietro Ghedin who was at the helm of the Malta senior side.

After the sacking of Tom Saintfiet, Farrugia was appointed as head coach for Malta's senior team.

Farrugia debuted as Malta manager on 29 May 2018, against the Armenia national football team with a satisfactory draw. He introduced Malta national under-21 football team players in the squad, such as the likes of Jake Grech and Jurgen Degabriele. He also handed a full debut to Gozitan Ferdinando Apap. Farrugia's second match was a narrow defeat of 1–0 against the Georgia national football team.

After finishing in the last position in the UEFA Euro 2020 qualifying group, in November 2019 the Malta Football Association announced that Farrugia's contract will not be renewed after its expiry at the end of the year.

Managerial statistics

Honours
 Midalja għall-Qadi tar-Repubblika (Medal for Service to the Republic): 2020

References

External links 
 

1955 births
Living people
People from Floriana
Maltese footballers
Maltese football managers
Association football forwards
Floriana F.C. players
Parramatta FC players
Naxxar Lions F.C. players
Marsaxlokk F.C. managers
Sliema Wanderers F.C. managers
Malta national football team managers
Malta international footballers